Ernest Bong is a Ni-Vanuatu footballer who plays as a goalkeeper.

References 

Living people
1984 births
Vanuatuan footballers
People from Malampa Province
Vanuatu international footballers
Association football goalkeepers
Erakor Golden Star F.C. players
2012 OFC Nations Cup players